Men's Downhill World Cup 1966/1967

Calendar

Final point standings

In Men's Downhill World Cup 1966/67 the best 3 results count.

Men's Downhill Team Results

All points were shown including individual deduction. bold indicate highest score - italics indicate race wins

External links
 

Men's downhill
FIS Alpine Ski World Cup men's downhill discipline titles